A Pacemaker and a Sidecar (lit. "Hot Water, Cold Water") is a Canadian black comedy film, directed by André Forcier and released in 1976.

The film centres on a group of residents of a rooming house in a working class neighbourhood in Montreal, who have gathered for the birthday party of their landlord Polo (Jean Lapointe), a local crime boss and loan shark. The guests at the party include Amédée (Albert Payette) and Panama (Guy L'Écuyer), a gay couple who cater the party, and Carmen (Sophie Clément), a woman who owes Polo money for her daughter Francine's (Louise Gagnon) pacemaker and decides to pay the debt off with sex. Meanwhile, Francine and her boyfriend Ti-Guy (Réjean Audet), who both dislike Polo, hatch a plot to kill him which backfires when another guest at the party dies instead.

Distribution
The film premiered in the Directors' Fortnight program at the 1976 Cannes Film Festival, and was later screened at the 1976 Festival of Festivals. Its screening at Toronto sparked a dispute between the festival and the national Film Festivals Bureau, with festival organizers claiming that they had been denied a screening on the grounds that the festival was too new and unimportant, while the Festivals Bureau claimed that it was simply a scheduling conflict, as the film's sole English print had already been booked by the Chicago International Film Festival, which was running at the same time as Toronto's festival. A compromise was reached whereby the print was shipped to Toronto for a screening in the early part of the festival, so that it could then be sent back to Chicago in time for that festival's scheduled screening.

Due to a technical issue with the film's original print, which was not noticed by theatrical audiences but became visible only when the film was transferred to higher-definition digital formats, it remained unavailable for many years on DVD or streaming platforms. A full digital restoration of the film was released to streaming platforms in April 2020.

References

External links
 

1976 films
1976 comedy films
Canadian black comedy films
Canadian crime comedy films
Canadian LGBT-related films
1970s French-language films
Films directed by André Forcier
Films set in Montreal
Films shot in Montreal
1975 LGBT-related films
1975 films
LGBT-related black comedy films
French-language Canadian films
1970s Canadian films